Maria Bengtsson (born 5 March 1964) is a badminton player from Sweden who played in three editions of Olympic games in 1988, 1992 and 1996.

Career
She won two silver medals at the World Badminton Championships, one in 1985 in mixed doubles with Stefan Karlsson and another in 1991 in women's doubles with Christine Magnusson. She won a bronze medal at the 1989 IBF World Championships in women's doubles, also with Magnusson.

Bengtsson competed in badminton at the 1992 Summer Olympics in women's singles and women's doubles with Catrine Bengtsson, and they lost in the quarterfinals to Guan Weizhen and Nong Qunhua, of China, 15-4, 15-9.

Personal life 
Her daughter Johanna Magnusson is also a badminton player.

Achievements

World Championships 
Mixed doubles

European Championships 
Mixed doubles

International tournaments 
Mixed doubles

References

External links
 
 
 

1964 births
Living people
Swedish female badminton players
Badminton players at the 1992 Summer Olympics
Badminton players at the 1996 Summer Olympics
Olympic badminton players of Sweden
Badminton players at the 1988 Summer Olympics
Sportspeople from Malmö
20th-century Swedish women